Nicholas Edward Franklin (born March 2, 1991) is an American professional baseball second baseman and outfielder who is currently a free agent. He was drafted by the Seattle Mariners in the first round, 27th pick overall, of the 2009 Major League Baseball Draft. He attended Lake Brantley High School where he won numerous awards, including being named the player of the year by the Orlando Sentinel in 2009. He has played in Major League Baseball (MLB) for the Seattle Mariners, Tampa Bay Rays, Milwaukee Brewers, and Los Angeles Angels.

Amateur career
In 2007 and 2008, Franklin played for the USA Baseball Youth National Team, which played in Canada and Venezuela. Franklin attended Lake Brantley High School. He took two months off of baseball after his junior season to weight train. On April 16, 2009 Orlando Sentinel named Franklin the "Boy Athlete of the Week". Franklin was named the "Orlando Sentinel Baseball Player of the Year" in 2009 after he batted .538 with 11 home runs. During his time in high school, a professional baseball scout compared Franklin's skills to that of a "switch-hitting Michael Young".

Professional career

Seattle Mariners
Franklin was drafted by the Seattle Mariners in the first round of the 2009 Major League Baseball Draft. Before being drafted, Franklin committed to play baseball at Auburn University. On August 16, 2009, the Mariners signed Franklin to a contract with a $1.28 million signing bonus. Franklin began his professional career in 2009, splitting the season between the rookie-league AZL Mariners of the Arizona League, and the Class-A Short-Season Everett AquaSox of the Northwest League. In the Arizona league, Franklin batted .302 with six runs, 13 hits, two doubles, one home run, and four runs batted in (RBIs) in 10 games. With the AquaSox, Franklin batted .400 with four runs, eight hits, two doubles, one triple, and two RBIs in six games.

Before the 2010 season, Baseball America named Franklin the seventh-best prospect in the Mariners' organization. Franklin began the 2010 season with the Class-A Clinton LumberKings of the Midwest League. On April 11, Franklin hit two home runs in the same game. Also in that game, Franklin was a single shy of hitting for the cycle. With the LumberKings that year, Franklin has batted .281 with 89 runs, 144 hits, 22 doubles, seven triples, 23 home runs, 65 RBIs, and 25 stolen bases. He also played one game with the Double-A West Tenn Diamond Jaxx in 2010, getting two hits in three at-bats. His 2010 season with the LumberKings features prominently in the book Class A: Baseball in the Middle of Everywhere, by Lucas Mann. At the end of the season, Baseball American named him as the sixth best prospect in the Midwest League.

Franklin made his major league debut for the Seattle Mariners on May 27, 2013. He recorded his first career hit on May 29, 2013. On May 30, 2013, Franklin hit his first two career home runs. He set a club record, being the quickest player to have a two-homer game in just his fourth game. The previous record was held by former Mariner Jose Cruz Jr. who had a two-homer game in his sixth game as a rookie in 1997.

Franklin hit his first major-league grand slam on July 21, 2013, in the second inning versus Houston Astros pitcher Jordan Lyles.

Tampa Bay Rays
On July 31, 2014, Franklin was traded, along with left-hander Drew Smyly to the Tampa Bay Rays in a three team deal that sent David Price to the Detroit Tigers and Austin Jackson to the Seattle Mariners. Franklin finished the 2016 season with a .270 batting average. He was designated for assignment on April 1, 2017.

Milwaukee Brewers
Franklin was claimed off waivers by the Milwaukee Brewers on April 5, 2017. On June 27, he was designated for assignment by the Brewers.

Los Angeles Angels
Franklin was traded to the Los Angeles Angels on June 30, 2017. He elected free agency on November 6, 2017.

Second stint with the Brewers
On February 15, 2018, Franklin signed a minor league contract with the Milwaukee Brewers. Franklin was called up in early May but after two at bats, he missed the entire season with a quad injury. He elected free agency on October 23, 2018.

Pittsburgh Pirates
On February 6, 2019, Franklin signed a minor league deal with the Pirates. He was released on June 28, 2019.

Second stint with the Angels
On July 5, 2019, Franklin signed a minor league deal with the Los Angeles Angels and was assigned to the Triple-A Salt Lake Bees. He became a free agent on November 4, 2019.

Kansas City Monarchs
On April 27, 2021, Frankin signed with the Kansas City Monarchs of the American Association of Professional Baseball. He appeared in just 4 games, going 4-for-14, before being placed on the inactive list.

Sioux City Explorers
On August 28, 2021, Franklin was traded to the Sioux City Explorers of the American Association of Professional Baseball for the reversionary rights to RHP Nick Belzer and future considerations.

Kane County Cougars
On August 5, 2022, Franklin was traded to the Kane County Cougars of the American Association of Professional Baseball for 2 players to be named later and cash.

Scouting report
Jim Street, reporter for MLB.com, calls Franklin a "versatile" player who can play the infield, the outfield, and even pitch. Jonathan Mayo, also of MLB.com, said that Franklin has the potential for power, and also noted that "[Franklin's] got wiry strength and decent speed". MLB.com rated Franklin a "solid defender" and his arm strength "average". Seattle Mariners' general manager Jack Zduriencik and scouting director Tom McNamara were reportedly impressed by Franklin's dedication to the game of baseball. On January 25, 2011 MLB.com revealed their top 50 best prospects in baseball list, in which Franklin was listed as the 38th best prospect in Major League Baseball. With the Mariners, Franklin was a relative rarity among big league players in using a batting helmet with two ear flaps (others to use this sort of helmet include Shane Victorino and Shin-Soo Choo). Since joining the Rays he has started using a more conventional one-flap helmet.

References

External links

1991 births
Living people
Baseball players from Florida
Lake Brantley High School alumni
Major League Baseball second basemen
People from Altamonte Springs, Florida
Sportspeople from Sanford, Florida
Seattle Mariners players
Tampa Bay Rays players
Milwaukee Brewers players
Los Angeles Angels players
Arizona League Mariners players
Everett AquaSox players
Clinton LumberKings players
West Tennessee Diamond Jaxx players
High Desert Mavericks players
Jackson Generals (Southern League) players
Tacoma Rainiers players
Durham Bulls players
Peoria Javelinas players
Charlotte Stone Crabs players
Salt Lake Bees players
Biloxi Shuckers players
Indianapolis Indians players
Bradenton Marauders players
Arizona League Brewers players
Carolina Mudcats players